Chad Rinehart (born May 4, 1985) is a former American football guard. He played college football at Northern Iowa, and was drafted by the Washington Redskins in the third round with the 96th overall pick in the 2008 NFL Draft. Rinehart has been a member of the New York Jets, Buffalo Bills and San Diego Chargers.

Early years 
Rinehart played high school football at Boone High School in Boone, Iowa, where he also played the cello in the school orchestra.

College career 
Rinehart played college football at Northern Iowa.

Professional career

Washington Redskins 
The Washington Redskins drafted Rinehart in the third round, 96th overall, of the 2008 NFL Draft. Rinehart signed a four-year contract with the team on July 10, 2008.

He suffered a broken fibula after being rolled up on by Anthony Spencer against the Dallas Cowboys on November 22, 2009. Rinehart returned from the injury and began to improve however the Redskins decided to part ways with the veteran on September 4, 2010, during the final round of roster cuts prior to the start of the season.

New York Jets 
On September 29, 2010, the New York Jets signed Rinehart to their practice squad following the promotion of wide receiver Patrick Turner. Rinehart was released from New York's practice squad on October 13, 2010.

Buffalo Bills 
On October 18, 2010, the Buffalo Bills signed Rinehart to their practice squad. Rinehart was promoted to the active roster on December 7, 2010 after Kraig Urbik suffered a season-ending knee injury.
Rinehart played at guard in 2011 and also filled in at center. He was tendered in April 2012.

San Diego Chargers 
On March 13, 2013, Rinehart signed with the San Diego Chargers. The Chargers re-signed him to a two-year, $6 million contract on March 10, 2014. On March 10, 2015, Rinehart was released.

Arrest 
On January 20, 2010 at 2:00 A.M., Rinehart was arrested on public intoxication charges in Cedar Falls, Iowa after he pulled on a locked door at Mojo's Pizza House, thus triggering an alarm, and refused to take a breath test. Rinehart was later released from jail via court order. Rinehart was found guilty of the charge in June 2010 and was ordered to pay a $195 fine.

Current Employment 
Rinehart now works at Waverly-Shell Rock High School in Waverly, Iowa as a strength and conditioning coach.

References

External links 

 Buffalo Bills bio
 San Diego Chargers bio

1985 births
Living people
People from Boone, Iowa
Players of American football from Iowa
American football offensive guards
American football offensive tackles
Northern Iowa Panthers football players
Washington Redskins players
New York Jets players
Buffalo Bills players
San Diego Chargers players